Yannis Clementia (born 5 July 1997) is a Martiniquais professional footballer who plays as goalkeeper for Caen.

Professional career
Clementia began playing football as a child with his local Martiniquais side Club Franciscain. After some trials in metropolitan France, he moved there in 2012 to continue his footballing career. On 14 May 2019, Clementia signed his first professional contract with OGC Nice. He made his professional debut for Nice in a 2–1 Ligue 1 win over Amiens SC on 10 August 2019. In June 2020, he was released by Nice at the end of his contract. On 3 February 2021, Clementia joined Ligue 2 side Caen on a free transfer until the end of the season.

International career
Clementia was called up to represent the Martinique national team for a pair of friendlies in March 2022. He debuted with Martinique in a friendly 4–3 win over Guadeloupe on 26 March 2022.

References

External links
 
 
 

1997 births
Living people
Sportspeople from Fort-de-France
Martiniquais footballers
Martinique international footballers
French footballers
French people of Martiniquais descent
Association football goalkeepers
OGC Nice players
Ligue 1 players
Championnat National 2 players
Championnat National 3 players
Stade Malherbe Caen players